Chelsea is a town in Kennebec County, Maine, United States. The population was 2,778 at the 2020 census. It is home to the Togus Veterans Administration facilities.

History

Chelsea was incorporated as a town on March 1, 1851 separating from a portion of Hallowell. The town was named after the town of Chelsea, Massachusetts.

Geography

Situated on the east bank of the Kennebec River, Chelsea is bordered on the west by Hallowell, on the north by Augusta, on the southwest by Farmingdale, on the south by Randolph and Pittston, and on the east by Whitefield. Chelsea is considered part of the Augusta, Maine micropolitan New England City and Town Area.

Demographics

2010 census

As of the census of 2010, there were 2,721 people, 1,046 households, and 758 families living in the town. The racial makeup of the town was 97.0% White, 0.1% African American, 1.1% Native American, 0.7% Asian, 0.1% Pacific Islander, 0.1% from other races, and 1.0% from two or more races. Hispanic or Latino of any race were 0.8% of the population.

There were 1,046 households, of which 31.0% had children under the age of 18 living with them, 57.0% were married couples living together, 10.2% had a female householder with no husband present, 5.3% had a male householder with no wife present, and 27.5% were non-families. 20.7% of all households were made up of individuals, and 8% had someone living alone who was 65 years of age or older. The average household size was 2.48 and the average family size was 2.80.

The median age in the town was 44.9 years. 20.3% of residents were under the age of 18; 6.8% were between the ages of 18 and 24; 23.3% were from 25 to 44; 35.2% were from 45 to 64; and 14.6% were 65 years of age or older. The gender makeup of the town was 51.6% male and 48.4% female.

2000 census

As of the census of 2000, there were 2,559 people, 959 households, and 701 families living in the town. The racial makeup of the town was 96.99% White, 0.27% African American, 0.98% Native American, 0.78% Asian, 0.08% from other races, and 0.90% from two or more races. Hispanic or Latino of any race were 0.47% of the population.

There were 959 households, out of which 33.7% had children under the age of 18 living with them, 58.7% were married couples living together, 9.0% had a female householder with no husband present, and 26.9% were non-families. 20.4% of all households were made up of individuals, and 7.0% had someone living alone who was 65 years of age or older.  The average household size was 2.57 and the average family size was 2.93.

In the town, the population was spread out, with 24.2% under the age of 18, 6.7% from 18 to 24, 29.5% from 25 to 44, 28.1% from 45 to 64, and 11.5% who were 65 years of age or older.  The median age was 39 years. For every 100 females, there were 114.0 males.  For every 100 females age 18 and over, there were 114.1 males.

The median income for a household in the town was $40,905, and the median income for a family was $44,688. Males had a median income of $30,793 versus $23,781 for females. The per capita income for the town was $17,591.  About 13.6% of families and 15.1% of the population were below the poverty line, including 16.0% of those under age 18 and 21.7% of those age 65 or over.

References

External links
Town of Chelsea Official Website
Chelsea at Maine.Gov
Epodunk Town Profile
History of Chelsea, Maine

Towns in Kennebec County, Maine
Populated places established in 1851
Towns in Maine
1851 establishments in Maine